Northern Gallery for Contemporary Art (NGCA) is a contemporary art gallery which is based in Sunderland, England. The gallery focuses on producing exhibitions of new work by emerging and established regional, national and international artists. The gallery relocated from its city centre location on Fawcett Street, and reopened in a generous 3000 square foot space inside National Glass Centre in March 2018. Prior to the opening of the Baltic Centre for Contemporary Art in Gateshead, NGCA was the largest venue dedicated to contemporary art in North East England.

In 2019, Northern Gallery for Contemporary Art was 50 years old, being the direct descendant of 'Bookshop Gallery' founded in 1969 and its successor Ceolfrith Arts Centre, later Northern Centre for Contemporary Art. Despite the changes in location and name, the gallery's commitment to innovative, experimental art has been a constant. During its fifty years it has given UK premieres to artists from Sean Scully to Claes Oldenberg and Coosje van Bruggen, from Sam Taylor-Wood to Spartacus Chetwynd, and given the first UK shows to Cory Arcangel and Harun Farocki.

It is only in its current incarnation that the gallery has been able to acquire works from artists, in order to tell stories about the history of contemporary art, as well as to create 'news'. Through the exceptional generosity of artists over this period, the gallery has begun a collection of contemporary art for the city of Sunderland that now includes over a hundred works.

The gallery is also working closely with National Glass Centre to ensure that artists interested in working with glass are able to realise ambitious art in new ways, working with world leading makers based in the University of Sunderland.

External links
 Official website
 Spotlight on Gallery Reopening

Art museums and galleries in Tyne and Wear
Contemporary art galleries in England
Museums in the City of Sunderland
Culture in Tyne and Wear
Sunderland